A Fall from Grace is a 2020 American thriller film produced, written, and directed by Tyler Perry and his first to be released by Netflix. The film follows a woman who finds a dangerous new love and the novice attorney who defends her in a sensational court case. This was the final film of actor Cicely Tyson before her death in January 2021.

Plot
Jasmine Bryant (Bresha Webb) is a public defender who constantly takes plea deals in small town Virginia. Her husband Jordan (Matthew Law) is a police officer who is discouraged after witnessing an older woman he attempted to save complete a suicide attempt.

Jasmine is assigned by her boss Rory (Tyler Perry) to defend Grace Waters (Crystal Fox), a woman accused of murdering her husband Shannon DeLong (Mehcad Brooks). Grace insists that she is guilty and will agree to a plea deal if she goes to a prison close by her son Malcolm (Walter Fauntleroy). Jasmine is troubled by case details, including Shannon's missing body. Rory is not pleased that Jasmine wants to represent the suspect because the department does not have the budget for a trial, and he expects the media frenzy will disrupt their lives.

Grace’s best friend Sarah Miller (Phylicia Rashad) tells Jasmine that Grace was feeling sad after her divorce, and she pushed her to get out and meet someone new. She ended up marrying Shannon. After researching the case some more, Jasmine and her colleagues Tilsa (Angela Marie Rigsby) and Donnie (Donovan Christie, Jr.) believe Grace is innocent. Grace tells Jasmine that she met Shannon at a gallery exhibit of his work. He charmed Grace and they married three months later. Grace says that Shannon soon became cruel and secretive. After he got her passwords and secretly stole from her accounts, he mortgaged her house with forged documents. Eventually, the bank fired Grace. The last night, Grace walked in on Shannon and another woman having sex in the marriage bed. Later the couple argued; she beat him with a baseball bat and pushed him down the stairs to the basement. Grace drove away, calling Sarah from the country to confess the killing. Sarah tells Jasmine that when she went to Grace's house, she saw her son Malcolm leaving the house. Because Shannon's body is missing, Sarah believes that Malcolm helped Grace dispose of it.

At the trial, Jasmine fails to cast doubt on prosecution evidence. at proving Grace's innocence. Calling Sarah as a witness backfires because phone records show numerous phone calls between the women on the night of the murder, and Sarah finally admits on the stand that Grace confessed to killing Shannon to her. Grace is found guilty by the jury. As she is being led away, Grace sees Sarah in the gallery, comforting a sobbing Malcolm. Grace notices that Sarah is wearing a pendant identical to one that Shannon had that was supposedly one-of-a-kind. In her cell, Grace thinks back to the times that Sarah was involved in her relationship with Shannon, and screams to the guards that she needs to call her lawyer.

Feeling defeated, Jasmine stops by Sarah's house (a residence for old ladies) and notices an elderly woman named Alice (Cicely Tyson) trying to escape from the house. Alice wants to leave the house and reveals that other women have died there, including Shane Fieldman (Jordan's victim from the beginning of the film). When Jasmine discovers there are numerous elderly women locked up in the basement, she is kidnapped. Jordan discovers Sarah's criminal history and searches for his wife. Shannon turns out to be alive and is revealed to be Sarah's son. Jordan knocks on the door and asks Sarah if Jasmine is there and she denies it. When Jordan calls her, he hears her phone ringing from inside the house, so he bursts in, tussles with Sarah, handcuffs her, and then looks for Jasmine as Sarah escapes. Jordan and Shannon fight as Jasmine tries to break free. Shannon is shot and is presumably killed.

As the police rescue the elderly women, it is revealed that Sarah and Shannon are really mother and son criminals Betty and Maurice Mills, who have been kidnapping elderly women for their social security information and conning middle aged women out of their life savings for over 25 years with Grace being one of those middle aged women. Grace gets one more hearing and this time, Jasmine succeeds at defending Grace by presenting new evidence that Grace was victimized by Betty and Maurice's scheme to steal her life savings, and another piece of evidence that reveals that Betty and Maurice are wanted in several states for stealing from other numerous women, which is enough for the judge to grant Grace her freedom. While everyone celebrates Grace's freedom, Rory congratulates Jasmine for uncovering such a crazy scheme. Meanwhile, Betty is on the run from the police and has just been hired  to take care of an elderly woman in a nursing home.

Cast

Production
Principal photography took place at Tyler Perry Studios in fall 2018, over the course of five days.

Release
A Fall from Grace was released in the United States by Netflix on January 17, 2020. The film was watched by 26 million during its first week.

Reception
A Fall from Grace received largely negative reviews. The website's critical consensus reads, "Drama for drama's sake does not a great movie make, but boy is it fun to watch A Fall From Grace unravel." On Metacritic, the film holds a rating of 34 out of 100, based on seven critics, indicating "generally unfavorable reviews".

Many on social media have criticized the glaring errors in the film in the forms of seeing boom microphones, continuity errors, and extras staring directly into the camera and "miming" actions, possibly attributed to the very limited production schedule. Sometime after the film's release, the movie went through further edits and alternate cuts to fix these problems. There were little to no announcements regarding these changes. The line "Ashtray, bitch!", has become something of an internet meme due to its forceful, yet unintentionally funny delivery. Tyler Perry claimed that the line was not in the script and something he had added on the spot stating, "that was my father doing stupid stuff".

References

External links
 
 

2020 films
Films shot in Atlanta
American thriller films
2020 thriller films
Films with screenplays by Tyler Perry
Films directed by Tyler Perry
English-language Netflix original films
2020s English-language films
African-American films
2020s American films